A Very Harold & Kumar Christmas (previously titled A Very Harold & Kumar 3D Christmas) is a 2011 American buddy stoner comedy film directed by Todd Strauss-Schulson and written by Jon Hurwitz and Hayden Schlossberg. The sequel to Harold & Kumar Escape from Guantanamo Bay (2008), it is the third installment in the Harold & Kumar franchise, and stars John Cho, Kal Penn, and Neil Patrick Harris. The film follows estranged friends Harold Lee (Cho) and Kumar Patel (Penn) as they reunite to hunt for a Christmas tree.

Preparations for the film began in May 2009, with Hurwitz, Schlossberg, and Strauss-Schulson signing soon thereafter. Cho, Harris, and Penn returned by June 2010, with the latter departing his role in the U.S. Office of Public Liaison to reprise his role in A Very Harold & Kumar Christmas. Principal photography began later that month and lasted until that August, with filming locations including Detroit, Los Angeles, and New York City. Its marketing campaign used guerilla tactics led by Cho and Penn to promote the film's 3D and animated elements, a new for the franchise.

A Very Harold & Kumar Christmas was theatrically released in the United States on November 4, 2011, by Warner Bros. The film received generally positive critical reception, with praise for the Christmas theme and performances of Cho, Penn, and Harris, but criticism for some of its humor.

Plot
Seven years after escaping from Guantanamo Bay detention camp, and two years after they have last spoken, best friends and roommates Harold Lee and Kumar Patel have gone their separate ways. Harold has given up smoking cannabis, become a successful businessman on Wall Street and married his Latina girlfriend Maria. Kumar, on the other hand, still lives in the messy apartment he once shared with Harold after getting kicked out of medical school due to failing a drug test. Kumar has recently been dumped again by his girlfriend Vanessa, who arrives at Kumar's apartment to inform him that she is pregnant with his child. Maria's father and Harold's father-in-law Mr. Perez decides to stay at Harold and Maria's house for Christmas. Mr. Perez, who does not like Harold, brings his prized Christmas tree that he has been growing for eight years, and gives Harold a short lecture about the tree's importance to his family. Kumar receives a package with Harold's name on it at his apartment and decides to deliver it to Harold. At Harold's house, they discover the item inside to be a large marijuana joint.

Kumar lights the joint, but Harold throws it out of the window, only for it to magically land in the tree - resulting in it being burnt down. Harold learns that Kumar's new friend Adrian is attending a party with a Fraser Fir Christmas tree, and promises to drive him to the party on the condition that he can have the tree. Harold, Kumar, Adrian, and Todd (Harold's new best friend) arrive at the party, where a girl named Mary attempts to seduce Harold, Mary is revealed to be the daughter of Russian mob kingpin Sergei Katsov, who sends two of his men to kill Harold and Kumar, believing that they were trying to rape his daughter after Harold refuses to have sex with Mary. The duo make it out of the building without the Christmas tree and run into their friends, Rosenberg and Goldstein, for the first time in years. Harold and Kumar plan to steal a tree from a church, but end up participating in a Christmas show featuring Neil Patrick Harris, who they thought had died after being shot outside a Texas whorehouse seven years ago. Harris reveals that he did die, but Jesus Christ kicked him out of Heaven. Revealing that he is now telepathic, Harris hooks the pair up with a Christmas tree and a Wafflebot before sending them off.

The two make their way to Harold's house to put up the tree, but end up being kidnapped by two of Katsov's men, and are saved by Wafflebot. After Harold accidentally shoots Santa Claus in the head, Kumar gives him emergency surgery. In exchange for saving his life, Santa agrees to fly them back home in his sleigh, and reveals that he sent the package to reunite the friends. Harold arrives home to encounter Mr. Perez, who is angered when he discovers his Christmas tree is gone. Harold finally stands up to him, explaining that he may not be the perfect son-in-law, but he is the perfect guy for Maria. Mr. Perez says that he always knew Harold was a nice guy, he just wanted to make sure that he had "cojones" before accepting him into his family. Harold and Kumar rekindle their friendship, Kumar and Vanessa rekindle their romance, and Kumar tells Vanessa that he will re-take the exams to become a doctor and give up weed for the sake of their child; however, Vanessa advises him to break the latter, promising to give him her urine for another drug test. Maria discovers that she is pregnant on Christmas morning and that Santa has left a replacement tree in their lounge. Harold decides to smoke weed again, and he and Kumar share a joint for the first time in years. Santa flies overhead, smoking a bong, wishing everyone a merry Christmas.

Cast

 John Cho as Harold Lee
 Kal Penn as Kumar Patel
 Neil Patrick Harris as a fictionalized version of himself  
 Danny Trejo as Carlos Perez, Maria's father
 Danneel Harris as Vanessa Fanning
 Elias Koteas as Sergei Katsov
 Paula Garcés as Maria Perez-Lee
 Thomas Lennon as Todd
 Patton Oswalt as Larry Juston / Mall Santa
 Eddie Kaye Thomas as Andy Rosenberg
 David Krumholtz as Seth Goldstein
 Amir Blumenfeld as Adrian
 Richard Riehle as Santa Claus
 Jordan Hinson as Mary Katsov
 John Hoogenakker as Gustav
 Jake Johnson as Jesus
 Bobby Lee as Kenneth Park
 Yasen Peyankov as Yuri
 Melissa Gaston as Gracie
 RZA as Lamar
 Da'Vone McDonald as Latrell
 Brett Gelman as T.V. Director
 Dana DeLorenzo as Becca
 David Burtka as a fictionalized version of himself
 Dan Levy as Reporter

Production
In April 2009, Kal Penn accepted a position in the Obama administration as associate director of the White House Office of Public Liaison. When asked if his new job would mean no more Harold and Kumar films, he said, "That's probably true for now." However, A Very Harold & Kumar Christmas was announced on May 7, 2009, for release on December 5, 2010, at the earliest and possibly deferred to the 2011 holiday season. Jon Hurwitz and Hayden Schlossberg returned to write the film while Todd Strauss-Schulson directed and Greg Shapiro returned as producer. Penn left his job with the White House on June 1, 2010, to reprise his role as Kumar in the third Harold & Kumar installment.

Filming took place in Detroit, Los Angeles, and New York City from June to August 2010, with the use of Panavision Genesis HD and Element Technica 3D Rig. The film was released in RealD 3D on November 4, 2011. Animators from Laika created the clay animation scene.

After filming was completed, Penn returned to the White House. Cho and Penn went on a tour to promote the film in different college towns. At each stop they had a bus hand out "munchies".

Reception

Box office
During its first weekend, the film opened at third place behind Puss in Boots and Tower Heist, grossing $13 million, below its prediction of $18 million. At the end of its box office run, the film earned a total of $35.4 million, against a budget of $19 million.

Critical response
On Rotten Tomatoes, the film has an approval rating of 68%, based on 131 reviews, with a rating average of 6.15/10. The site's critical consensus reads, "Still raunchy, still irreverent, and still hit-and-miss, this Harold & Kumar outing also has a Christmas miracle: The audience gets to see the sweeter side of the duo." Metacritic, which assigns a weighted average score to reviews from mainstream critics, gives the film a score of 61 out of 100, based on 29 critics, indicating "generally favorable reviews". CinemaScore polls reported that the average grade moviegoers gave the film was a "B" on an A+ to F scale.

Roger Ebert of the Chicago Sun-Times gave the film 2.5 out of 4 stars, saying "It's not that I was particularly offended; it's that I didn't laugh very much."
Justin Chang of Variety wrote: "This vulgar romp is a generally harmless, heartwarming affair, a cinematic Christmas cookie almost sweet and flaky enough to cover the fact that it's laced with hash, cocaine and assorted bodily fluids, blood included."
Kirk Honeycutt of The Hollywood Reporter called it "A mildly diverting naughty comedy, lacking the pure comic nastiness of Bad Santa or the sheer audacity of Up in Smoke."

Home media
A Very Harold & Kumar Christmas was released on DVD and Blu-ray Disc on  February 7, 2012. The film was released on Blu-ray Disc in two versions: firstly, Single-Disc Blu-ray and DVD combo  and secondly, Movie-Only Edition. As of February 3, 2015, the film has sold 607,330 video discs, including 447,288 DVDs and 160,042 Blu-ray Discs, giving a gross of $6,649,425 and $4,855,462 respectively, for a total gross of $11,504,887 in North America.

See also
 List of Christmas films
 Santa Claus in film

References

External links

 
 

2011 films
2011 3D films
2010s buddy comedy films
American buddy comedy films
American Christmas films
American films with live action and animation
American films about cannabis
American sequel films
2010s English-language films
Films about drugs
Films about race and ethnicity
Films set in New Jersey
Films set in New York City
Films set in 2011
Films shot in Michigan
Mandate Pictures films
New Line Cinema films
Warner Bros. films
American pregnancy films
Films shot in Detroit
Films shot in Los Angeles
Films shot in New York City
Films directed by Todd Strauss-Schulson
Films scored by William Ross
2010s Christmas films
2010s Christmas comedy films
Stoner films
2011 directorial debut films
Comedy films about Asian Americans
Films about Korean Americans
2011 comedy films
Santa Claus in film
2010s American films